A Bucket of Blood, also known as The Death Artist,  is a 1995 American comedy horror television film remake of the 1959 film of the same name. The 1995 remake follows the original closely, adapting it to a contemporary setting. The film was directed by comedian Michael McDonald, produced by Roger Corman, who produced and directed the original film, and cowritten by McDonald and Brendan Broderick, based on the 1959 screenplay by Charles B. Griffith.

The plot revolves around Walter Paisley (Anthony Michael Hall), a socially awkward busboy working at the Jabberjaw, an alternative coffee house which hosts performance art, poetry readings and live music. Walter wants to be an artist to impress his co-worker Carla (Justine Bateman), but lacks talent. While attempting to create an original sculpture, he accidentally kills his landlady's cat, and hides the dead animal by covering it in plaster and passing it off as a statue. After being acclaimed as a great artist, Walter begins to commit murder to produce new art.

The cast also includes cameos by David Cross, Paul Bartel, Mink Stole, Jennifer Coolidge and Will Ferrell, in his film debut. The film premiered on Showtime as the tenth episode of Roger Corman Presents, a series of made-for-cable films produced by Corman.

Plot 

At a Los Angeles coffee house called the Jabberjaw, several performance artists vie for the attention of Generation X hipsters, including Maxwell (Shadoe Stevens), a poet who declares that "life is nothing but a homeless traveler on the RTD of art", Mayolia (Sheila Travis), who performs monologues holding a toy monkey,  Cuff and Link (Victor Wilson and Patrick Bristow), a pair of sarcastic photographers who intentionally run over animals and photograph the road kill, and "Stupid Girl" (Jennifer Coolidge), who strips nude on stage while playing cello. Other regular attendants at the cafe include an older rich couple (Paul Bartel and Mink Stole) looking for art by new talent, and Lou (Kin Shriner), an undercover cop trying to bust heroin dealers operating in the cafe.

Working for Leonard (Sam Lloyd) are busboy Walter (Anthony Michael Hall) and Italian hostess Carla (Justine Bateman). To impress Carla, who he has a crush on, Walter tries to produce a clay sculpture of her face, but is unsuccessful due to his lack of talent. He hears his landlady's cat Frankie in the wall, discovering that the animal had been mistakenly plastered into the wall, and attempts to cut it out with a knife, but accidentally kills it. The next morning, Walter decides to cover up the dead animal with plaster and presents it as a "thing I made" called Dead Cat. The regulars and other artists love the "sculpture", and Mayolia gives Walter a necklace containing a nickel bag of heroin, leading Lou to follow Walter back to his apartment and confront him about it, which ends with Walter killing Lou with his frying pan, later deciding to hide the body in plaster and call it "Murdered Man". Leonard, having discovered the dead animal in Walter's first "statue", initially tries to call the police upon hearing about "Murdered Man", but covers up the murder when a customer offers Leonard a large amount of money for "Dead Cat". At a party for Walter, Alice (Darcy DeMoss), who had not been aware of Walter's popularity, insults him, but agrees to pose for his nude statue. At his apartment, Alice taunts Walter, suggesting he is a virgin, and he strangles her to death.

Walter reveals his true feelings for Carla at an art show, only for her to tell him that she doesn't love him, and he immediately asks her to model for him. However, she discovers Walter's dark nature when she finds Alice's body in the nude "sculpture", and runs away from Walter upon learning that he plans to murder her next. Once art critics begin commenting on the "brilliance" of a "creation within a creation", Lou's police partner breaks apart the "statues", revealing the corpses. The officer, along with Walter's friends, run after Walter and Carla, realizing that the artist is a murderer, and, realizing that he is about to be caught, Walter mixes a new batch of plaster, and the cop breaks down the door, revealing to the group that Walter has spattered his body with plaster and hanged himself. The experience leaves Carla mute, Leonard to burn down the Jabberjaw for insurance money and Maxwell to unsuccessfully imitate Walter's "suicide art", dying in the process. Cuff and Link, who always criticized Walter's art and accused him of fraud, finally become successful artists themselves, and live together as roommates, while Mayolia becomes the host of a successful children's television show.

Cast

Production
Anthony Michael Hall was cast because of his roles in the Brat Pack movies of the 1980s.  ”That's what people identify him with, for better or worse,” said associate producer Darin Spillman. ”We were remaking a 1950s film and wanted someone identified with a new generation.”

Reception

Joe Bob Briggs gave the film four stars, saying "They hardly changed the flick at all. It's the same goldurn movie." Allmovie's Fred Beldin wrote, "Although executive producer Corman was probably pleased to see his work refashioned with the gratuitous gore and nudity he couldn't use the first time around, Death Artist is fairly pointless."

References

External links 

 A Bucket of Blood on YouTube
 
 
A Bucket of Blood at Letterbox DVD

1995 television films
1995 films
American black comedy films
American comedy horror films
Remakes of American films
Horror film remakes
American horror television films
Films produced by Roger Corman
Films about sculptors
Films set in apartment buildings
American drama television films
1990s American films